Maksim Alekseyevich Rogov (born 11 February 1986) is a Russian former professional football player.

Club career
He played for the main squad of FC Zenit St. Petersburg in the Russian Cup.

Playing for FC Mordovia he became Football Championship of the National League 2011/12 winner.

Honours
 2016–17 Russian Professional Football League, Zone West best player.

References

External links
 

1986 births
Footballers from Saint Petersburg
Living people
Russian footballers
Association football forwards
FC Zenit Saint Petersburg players
FC Mordovia Saransk players
Russian Premier League players
FC Dynamo Saint Petersburg players
FC KAMAZ Naberezhnye Chelny players
FC Novokuznetsk players